The National Federation of Mining was a trade union representing workers in the mining industry in Spain.

The union was founded in 1976 and affiliated to the Workers' Commissions.  It had 15,118 in 1981, but by 1993 its membership had fallen to 11,604.  Later that year, it merged with the Federation of Metal, to form the Federation of Metalworkers and Miners.

General Secretaries
1978: Manuel Nevado Madrid
1990: Rafael Varea Nieto

References

Mining trade unions
Trade unions established in 1976
Trade unions disestablished in 1993
Trade unions in Spain